NGC 2663 (also known as PGC 24590) is an elliptical galaxy with a gaseous disk located in the constellation Pyxis. It is 93 million light years away from Earth. It hosts a compact central radio source and previous studies suggested that it also contains an active galactic nucleus (AGN). Although it was detected in 1886 and many observations of this galaxy have been conducted since then, many of its properties still remain unknown.

Discovery 
The galaxy was discovered on 8 February 1886 by Lewis A. Swift.

Black Hole 
In August 2022, astronomers from the Western Sydney University discovered a black hole shooting a jet at almost the speed of light, with enormous energy. The beam length is expected to be spanning more than a million light years from end to end. The jet of matter was shooting out of NGC 2663 from a black hole at its center. The jet stream was about 50 times larger than the galaxy itself. At the time of discovery it was one of the biggest jets ever observed. The astronomers used the Commonwealth Scientific and Industrial Research Organisation's (CSIRO) super-telescope the Australian Square Kilometer Array Pathfinder, which is a network of 36 linked radio dishes combined to form a single super telescope.

See also
 List of galaxies

References

External links
 

Pyxis
Elliptical galaxies
Luminous infrared galaxies
2663
24590
Discoveries by Lewis Swift
Galaxies discovered in 1886